The Central Union of Workers (CUT) is a Leftist trade union center in Colombia. It was formed in 1986, and is the country's largest union federation, with 546,000 members.

ICTUR reports that nearly 800 members of CUT were murdered between 1987 and 1992.

In 2000 a past president of CUT, Luis Eduardo Garzón was awarded the AFL–CIO human rights award.

References

Trade unions in Colombia
Trade unions established in 1986
1986 establishments in Colombia